Among scholars of nationalism, a number of types of nationalism have been presented. Nationalism may manifest itself as part of official state ideology or as a popular non-state movement and may be expressed along civic, ethnic, cultural, language, religious or ideological lines. These self-definitions of the nation are used to classify types of nationalism. However, such categories are not mutually exclusive and many nationalist movements combine some or all of these elements to varying degrees. Nationalist movements can also be classified by other criteria, such as scale and location.

Some political theorists make the case that any distinction between forms of nationalism is false. In all forms of nationalism, the populations believe that they share some kind of common culture. A main reason why such typology can be considered false is that it attempts to bend the fairly simple concept of nationalism to explain its many manifestations or interpretations. Arguably, all types of nationalism merely refer to different ways academics throughout the years have tried to define nationalism.  This school of thought accepts that nationalism is simply the desire of a nation to self-determine.

Ethnic nationalism 

Ethnic nationalism defines the nation in terms of ethnicity, which always includes some element of descent from previous generations, i.e. genophilia. It also includes ideas of a culture shared between members of the group and with their ancestors, and usually a shared language.  Membership in the nation is hereditary. The state derives political legitimacy from its status as homeland of the ethnic group, and from its duty to protect of the partly national group and facilitate its family and social life, as a group. Ideas of ethnicity are very old, but modern ethnic nationalism was heavily influenced by Johann Gottfried von Herder, who promoted the concept of the Volk, and Johann Gottlieb Fichte. Theorist Anthony D. Smith uses the term 'ethnic nationalism' for non-Western concepts of nationalism, as opposed to Western views of a nation defined by its geographical territory. The term "ethnonationalism" is generally used only in reference to nationalists who espouse an explicit ideology along these lines; "ethnic nationalism" is the more generic term, and used for nationalists who hold these beliefs in an informal, instinctive, or unsystematic way.  The pejorative form of both is "ethnocentric nationalism" or "tribal nationalism," though "tribal nationalism" can have a non-pejorative meaning when discussing African, Native American, or other nationalisms that openly assert a tribal identity.

Yael Tamir has argued that the differences between ethnic and civic nationalism are blurred.

Expansionist nationalism 
Expansionist nationalism is an aggressive radical form of nationalism or ethnic nationalism (ethnonationalism) that incorporates autonomous, heightened ethnic consciousness and patriotic sentiments with atavistic fears and hatreds focused on "other" or foreign peoples, framing a belief in expansion or recovery of formerly owned territories through militaristic means.

Romantic nationalism 
Romantic nationalism, also known as organic nationalism and identity nationalism, is the form of ethnic nationalism in which the state derives political legitimacy as a natural ("organic") consequence and expression of the nation, race, or ethnicity.  It reflected the ideals of Romanticism and was opposed to Enlightenment rationalism.  Romantic nationalism emphasized a historical ethnic culture which meets the Romantic Ideal; folklore developed as a Romantic nationalist concept.  The Brothers Grimm were inspired by Herder's writings to create an idealized collection of tales which they labeled as ethnically German.  Historian Jules Michelet exemplifies French romantic-nationalist history.

Cultural nationalism 
Cultural nationalism defines the nation by shared culture. Membership (the state of being members) in the nation is neither entirely voluntary (you cannot instantly acquire a culture), nor hereditary (children of members may be considered foreigners if they grew up in another culture). Yet, a traditional culture can be more easily incorporated into an individual's life, especially if the individual is allowed to acquire its skills at an early stage of his/her own life.
Cultural nationalism has been described as a variety of nationalism that is neither purely civic nor ethnic. The nationalisms of Catalonia, Quebec, and Flanders have been described as cultural.

Language nationalism 

Bill 101 is a law in the province of Quebec in Canada defining French, the language of the majority of the population, as the official language of the provincial government. Other forms of language nationalism is the English-only movement that advocates for the use of only the English language in English speaking nations such as the USA or Australia.

Religious nationalism 
Religious nationalism is the relationship of nationalism to a particular religious belief, church, Hindu temple or affiliation. This relationship can be broken down into two aspects; the politicization of religion and the converse influence of religion on politics. In the former aspect, a shared religion can be seen to contribute to a sense of national unity, by the citizens of the nation. Another political aspect of religion is the support of a national identity, similar to a shared ethnicity, language or culture. The influence of religion on politics is more ideological, where current interpretations of religious ideas inspire political activism and action; for example, laws are passed to foster stricter religious adherence. Hindu nationalism is common in many states and union territories in India which joined the union of India solely on the basis of religion and post-colonial nationalism.

Post-colonial nationalism 
Since the process of decolonisation that occurred after World War II, there has been a rise of Third World nationalisms. Third world nationalisms occur in those nations that have been colonized and exploited. The nationalisms of these nations were forged in a furnace that required resistance to colonial domination in order to survive.  As such, resistance is part and parcel of such nationalisms and their very existence is a form of resistance to imperialist intrusions. Third World nationalism attempts to ensure that the identities of Third World peoples are authored primarily by themselves, not colonial powers.

Examples of third world nationalist ideologies are African nationalism and Arab nationalism. Other important nationalist movements in the developing world have included Indian nationalism, Chinese nationalism and the ideas of the Mexican Revolution and Haitian Revolution. Third world nationalist ideas have been particularly influential among governments elected in South America.

Civic nationalism 
Civic nationalism is the form of nationalism in which the state derives political legitimacy from the active participation of its citizenry, from the degree to which it represents the "will of the people". It is often seen as originating with Jean-Jacques Rousseau and especially the social contract theories which take their name from his 1762  book The Social Contract. Civic nationalism lies within the traditions of rationalism and liberalism, but as a form of nationalism it is contrasted with ethnic nationalism.  Membership of the civic nation is considered voluntary.  Civic-national ideals influenced the development of representative democracy in countries such as the United States and France.

State nationalism is a variant of civic nationalism, often (but not always) combined with ethnic nationalism.  It implies that the nation is a community of those who contribute to the maintenance and strength of the state, and that the individual exists to contribute to this goal.  Italian fascism is the best example, epitomized in this slogan of Benito Mussolini: "Tutto nello Stato, niente al di fuori dello Stato, nulla contro lo Stato" ("Everything in the State, nothing outside the State, nothing against the State").  It is no surprise that this conflicts with liberal ideals of individual liberty, and with liberal-democratic principles. The revolutionary Jacobin creation of a unitary and centralist French state is often seen as the original version of state nationalism. Francoist Spain is a later example of state nationalism.

However, the term "state nationalism" is often used in conflicts between nationalisms, and especially where a secessionist movement confronts an established "nation state". The secessionists speak of state nationalism to discredit the legitimacy of the larger state, since state nationalism is perceived as less authentic and less democratic. Flemish separatists speak of Belgian nationalism as a state nationalism. Basque separatists and Corsican separatists refer to Spain and France, respectively, in this way. There are no undisputed external criteria to assess which side is right, and the result is usually that the population is divided by conflicting appeals to its loyalty and patriotism. Critiques of supposed "civic nationalism" often call for the elimination of the term as it often represents either imperialism (in the case of France), patriotism, or simply an extension of "ethnic", or "real" nationalism.

Liberal nationalism 
Liberal nationalism is a kind of nationalism defended recently by political philosophers who believe that there can be a non-xenophobic form of nationalism compatible with liberal values of freedom, tolerance, equality, and individual rights. Ernest Renan, author of "Qu'est-ce qu'une nation?"  and John Stuart Mill are often thought to be early liberal nationalists. Liberal nationalists often defend the value of national identity by saying that individuals need a national identity in order to lead meaningful, autonomous lives and that liberal democratic polities need national identity in order to function properly.

Ideological nationalism

Revolutionary nationalism 
Revolutionary nationalism is a broad label that has been applied to many different types of nationalist political movements that wish to achieve their goals through a revolution against the established order. Individuals and organizations described as being revolutionary nationalist include some political currents within the French Revolution, Irish republicans engaged in armed struggle against the British crown, the Can Vuong movement against French rule in 19th century Vietnam, the Indian independence movement in the 20th century, some participants in the Mexican Revolution, Benito Mussolini and the Italian Fascists, the Autonomous Government of Khorasan, Augusto Cesar Sandino, the Revolutionary Nationalist Movement in Bolivia, black nationalism in the United States, and some African independence movements.

National conservatism 
National conservatism is a variant of conservatism common in Europe and Asia that concentrates on upholding national and cultural identity, usually combining this nationalist concern with conservative stances promoting traditional values. It shares characteristics with traditionalist conservatism and social conservatism given how the three variations focus on preservation and tradition. As national conservatism seeks to preserve national interests, traditional conservatism emphasizes ancestral institutions. Additionally, social conservatism emphasizes a patriarchal, restrictive attitude regarding moral behavior to preserve one's traditional status in society. National-conservative parties often have roots in environments with a rural, traditionalist or peripheral basis, contrasting with the more urban support base of liberal-conservative parties. In Europe, most embrace some form of Euroscepticism. The majority of conservative parties in post-communist Central and Eastern Europe since 1989 have been national conservative.

Liberation nationalism 
Many nationalist movements in the world are dedicated to national liberation in the view that their nations are being persecuted by other nations and thus need to exercise self-determination by liberating themselves from the accused persecutors. Anti-revisionist Marxist–Leninism is closely tied with this ideology, and practical examples include Stalin's early work Marxism and the National Question and his Socialism in One Country edict, which declares that nationalism can be used in an internationalist context i.e. fighting for national liberation without racial or religious divisions.

Left-wing nationalism 
Left-wing nationalism, also occasionally known as socialist nationalism, refers to any political movement that combines left-wing politics or socialism with nationalism. Notable examples include Fidel Castro's 26th of July Movement that launched the Cuban Revolution that ousted dictator Fulgencio Batista in 1959, Ireland's Sinn Féin, Labor Zionism in Israel and the African National Congress in South Africa.

Schools of anarchism which acknowledge nationalism 

Anarchists who see value in nationalism typically argue that a nation is first and foremost a people; that the state is parasite upon the nation and should not be confused with it; and that since in reality states rarely coincide with national entities, the ideal of the nation state is actually little more than a myth. Within the European Union, for instance, they argue there are over 500 ethnic nations within the 25 member states, and even more in Asia, Africa, and the Americas. Moving from this position, they argue that the achievement of meaningful self-determination for all of the world's nations requires an anarchist political system based on local control, free federation, and mutual aid. There has been a long history of anarchist involvement with left-nationalism all over the world.  Contemporary fusions of anarchism with anti-state left-nationalism include some strains of Black anarchism and indigenism.

In the early to mid 19th century Europe, the ideas of nationalism, socialism, and liberalism were closely intertwined. Revolutionaries and radicals like Giuseppe Mazzini aligned with all three in about equal measure. The early pioneers of anarchism participated in the spirit of their times: they had much in common with both liberals and socialists, and they shared much of the outlook of early nationalism as well. Thus Mikhail Bakunin had a long career as a pan-Slavic nationalist before adopting anarchism. He also agitated for a United States of Europe (a contemporary nationalist vision originated by Mazzini). In 1880–1881, the Boston-based Irish nationalist W. G. H. Smart wrote articles for a magazine called The Anarchist. Similarly, anarchists in China during the early part of the 20th century were very much involved in the left-wing of the nationalist movement while actively opposing racist elements of the anti-Manchu wing of that movement.

Pan-nationalism 
Pan-nationalism is usually an ethnic and cultural nationalism, but the 'nation' is itself a cluster of related ethnic groups and cultures, such as Slavic peoples. Occasionally pan-nationalism is applied to mono-ethnic nationalism, when the national group is dispersed over a wide area and several states - as in Pan-Germanism.

Diaspora nationalism 
Diaspora nationalism, or as Benedict Anderson terms it, "long-distance nationalism", generally refers to nationalist feeling among a diaspora such as the Irish in the United States, Jews around the world after the expulsion from Jerusalem (586 BCE), the Lebanese in the Americas and Africa, or Armenians in Europe and the United States. Anderson states that this sort of nationalism acts as a "phantom bedrock" for people who want to experience a national connection, but who do not actually want to leave their diaspora community. The essential difference between pan-nationalism and diaspora nationalism is that members of a diaspora, by definition, are no longer resident in their national or ethnic homeland. In some instances, 'Diaspora' refers to a dispersal of a people from a (real or imagined) 'homeland' due to a cataclysmic disruption, such as war, famine, etc. New networks - new 'roots' - form along the 'routes' travelled by diasporic people, who are connected by a shared desire to return 'home'. In reality, the desire to return may be eschatological (i.e. end times orientation), or may not occur in any foreseeable future, but the longing for the lost homeland and the sense of difference from circumambient cultures in which Diasporic people live becomes an identity unto itself.

See also 
 Anti-nationalism
 Integral nationalism
 Postnationalism
 Jingoism

Notes